Strathallan is the strath of the Allan Water in Scotland. The strath stretches north and north-east from Stirling through Bridge of Allan, Dunblane and Blackford to Auchterarder in Perth and Kinross.

Strathallan is also the name for one of the wards in the Perth and Kinross Council area.

In 2015 and 2016 Strathallan Castle, traditional seat of the Viscount Strathallan, hosted the T in the Park music festival which was forced to move from its previous site at Balado airfield due to safety concerns.
 
The main A9 road from central Scotland to the north of the country runs the length of Strathallan, as does the former Caledonian Railway line from Stirling to Perth and beyond.

Strathallan School, a private boarding and day school, was originally located in Bridge of Allan but relocated away from the area to Forgandenny, Perth in 1920.

References

Valleys of Perth and Kinross
Valleys of Stirling (council area)
T in the Park